The anterior lateral malleolar artery (lateral anterior malleolar artery, external malleolar artery) is an artery in the ankle.

The anterior lateral malleolar artery is a branch of the anterior tibial artery. It passes beneath the tendons of the extensor digitorum longus and fibularis tertius and supplies the lateral side of the ankle. It forms anastomoses with the perforating branch of the fibular artery, and with ascending twigs from the lateral tarsal artery.

References

External links
 http://www.dartmouth.edu/~humananatomy/figures/chapter_17/17-3.HTM 

Arteries of the lower limb